Newbridge railway station is on the Ebbw Valley Railway and serves the towns of Newbridge and Blackwood in south east Wales. The current station is on the site of the former station and coal yard in the town centre opposite the former Co-op Food store and existing council car park. The single-platform station and car park is off a signalised junction on Bridge Street.

History

Original station
The original station was opened by the Monmouthshire Railway and Canal Company on 23 December 1850, and closed to passengers on 30 April 1962 and to goods on 7 April 1969. It had 2 platforms.

Station reopened
The station and line reopened on 6 February 2008 when services between Cardiff Central and Ebbw Vale Parkway railway station commenced. In February 2009 Caerphilly County Borough Council started construction on a footbridge to link the station with the Comprehensive School, Leisure Centre and the town centre.

An hourly service operates in both directions on weekdays and Saturdays with a two-hourly Sunday service.

Future 

Doubling between Crosskeys and Aberbeeg Jct will require a second platform to be built at Newbridge and Llanhilleth

Following completion of the doubling and new platform (including Llanhilleth), an hourly train service between Ebbw Vale and Newport is planned.

References

Notes

Sources

External links 

Planning Approval Granted for New Railway Station
Archive of Ebbw Valley Railway Scheme website (Blaenau Gwent council, 2008)

Railway stations in Caerphilly County Borough
DfT Category F2 stations
Former Great Western Railway stations
Railway stations in Great Britain opened in 1850
Railway stations in Great Britain closed in 1962
Railway stations in Great Britain opened in 2008
Railway stations served by Transport for Wales Rail
Reopened railway stations in Great Britain